Monroe Public Schools is a school district in Monroe, Connecticut, United States.

Schools 
Chalk Hill Middle School (reopened December 19, 2012 as a temporary facility for Sandy Hook Elementary School students; it had to be evacuated on Wednesday, October 1, 2014, due to a bomb threat call) 
STEM Academy at Masuk High School
Early Intervention Center (Preschool)
Fawn Hollow Elementary School
Jockey Hollow School
Masuk High School
Monroe Elementary School
Stepney Elementary School
Pre-First Program

References

External links
Monroe Public Schools

School districts in Connecticut
Education in Fairfield County, Connecticut
Monroe, Connecticut